Zdeněk Bradáč (born February 27, 1987) is a Czech illusionist, magician, escapologist and juggler. He has been recognized for breaking multiple records for straitjacket and handcuff escapes as well as juggling and illusions.

Magician and illusionist

He started doing magic at the age of eleven and now performs both in the Czech Republic and abroad.

Guinness World Records

Bradac holds multiple Guinness World Records for escape, illusion and juggling.

According to Guinness, Bradáč has achieved, amongst his records the following feats:

The most handcuffs (7) unlocked in one minute in Jablonec nad Nisou, Czech Republic, on 15 February 2011
The fastest time to escape from three handcuffs underwater (38.69 seconds) in Jablonec nad Nisou, Czech Republic, on 9 September 2009.
The fastest handcuff escape (1.66 sec).
The longest duration juggling four objects (02:46:48) in Jablonec nad Nisou, Czech Republic, on 30 November 2010.

References

External links
 
 Zdenek Bradac on Guinness World Records
 Zdenek Bradac on Facebook
 Zdenek Bradac on YouTube

Living people
1987 births
Jugglers
Magicians
Czech entertainers
People from Liberec